South Korea participated in the 2007 Asian Indoor Games in Macau, China from 26 October to 3 November 2007.

Medal summary

Medal table

Medalists

|style="text-align:left;width:78%;vertical-align:top"|

Korea, South
Asian Indoor Games
2007